Sled Lake is a northern settlement in Northern Saskatchewan. The community is accessed from Highway 924.

Demographics 

See also 
 List of communities in Northern Saskatchewan
 List of communities in Saskatchewan

References 

Designated places in Saskatchewan
Division No. 18, Unorganized, Saskatchewan
Northern settlements in Saskatchewan